Hedjkheperre Setepenre Shoshenq (VII/VIa) Si-Ese Meryamun may have been an Egyptian king of the 23rd Dynasty, ruling Thebes in the period between the death of Takelot III and the Egyptian campaign of the Nubian king Piye, c. 755–730 BCE. The length of his reign has been estimated variously as between five and twenty-five years. He is poorly attested (Karnak Nile Level Text NLT 3 of year 5 and NLT 45 of year 17, 18 or 25), and his existence remains a matter of some dispute, but is supported by leading experts on the Third Intermediate Period such as Gerard Broekman and Kenneth Kitchen.

References 

8th-century BC Pharaohs
Pharaohs of the Twenty-third Dynasty of Egypt
People whose existence is disputed
Year of death unknown
Year of birth unknown